Andrew Christie may refer to:

Andrew D. Christie (1922–1993), Delaware Supreme Court Justice
Andrew Christie, Christie-Cleek